Bethlehem Catholic High School is a separate (Catholic) high school in Saskatoon, Saskatchewan, Canada, that opened in August 2007. It is located off 22nd Street West in the Blairmore Suburban Centre neighbourhood.

Bethlehem serves students living on the west side of Circle Drive. This school integrates faith and learning in a facility featuring a chapel, two gymnasiums and a theatre. It is physically connected to the public high school Tommy Douglas Collegiate through the adjacent Shaw Centre recreation facility.

Bethlehem was named after the birthplace of Jesus Christ, the foundation of the Christian religion.

On June 7, 2009, a fire destroyed an addition containing portable classrooms still under construction. Damage was estimated at $750,000. The fire caused only minor damage to the existing building. The cause of the fire was determined to be arson.

In 2011, work began on four classrooms to be added to the existing portables.

Currently its feeder schools are Bishop Klein School, Bishop Roborecki School, Father Vachon School, St. Dominic School, St. Gerard, St. Marguerite School, St. Lorenzo Ruiz Catholic School, St. Mark School and St. Peter School.

Recreation
Aside from in-house facilities, Bethlehem school is connected to the Shaw Centre recreation complex, which opened in 2009 with a 50-metre swimming pool.

Gallery

References

External links

Page 1 Blairmore Centre Newsletter OPEN HOUSE AND PUBLIC INPUT ...
2007-08 Saskatchewan Provincial Budget HIGHLIGHTS:
City of Saskatoon · Departments · Infrastructure Services ...
The Wayward Reporter COUNCIL FLIP-FLOPS ON BIG-BOX RULES HAVE BUSINESS OWNERS WORRIED. WILL DOWNTOWN BECOME THE HOLE IN SASKATOON’S CENTENNIAL DONUT? by Jeremy Warren
SASKATCHEWAN INVESTS $30 MILLION IN INNOVATIVE SASKATOON SCHOOL ...
City moves ahead on Blairmore Site
Learning #06-415 - SASKATCHEWAN INVESTS $30 MILLION IN INNOVATIVE ...
City of Saskatoon · Departments · Community Services · City Planning · ZAM Maps
Populace Spring 2006

High schools in Saskatoon
Catholic secondary schools in Saskatchewan
Educational institutions established in 2007
School buildings in Canada destroyed by arson
2007 establishments in Saskatchewan